The Revolutionary Communist Party is a Marxist-Leninist-Maoist political party from Uruguay.

Established in 1972, nowadays it is part of the leftist Popular Unity.

It takes part in the International Conference of Marxist–Leninist Parties and Organizations (International Newsletter)

Its secretary general is Ricardo Cohen.

See also 
 Communist Party of Ecuador – Red Sun
 Marxism-Leninism-Maoism

References

External links 
 Website 

Political parties established in 1972
Communist parties in Uruguay
Maoist parties
1972 establishments in Uruguay
International Conference of Marxist–Leninist Parties and Organizations (International Newsletter)
International Coordination of Revolutionary Parties and Organizations
Maoism in South America